XHML-FM is a radio station on 90.3 FM in León, Guanajuato. XHML is owned by Grupo Audiorama Comunicaciones and is known as La Bestia Grupera.

History
XHML received its concession on November 28, 1988 and has always been owned by a Radiorama component. For nearly thirty years, it was known as Estéreo Vida with a Spanish contemporary format.

On April 23, 2018, XHML shed its longtime format and name and relaunched as grupera station La Bestia Grupera, taking the Audiorama format, as part of Audiorama's entrance into León.

References

Radio stations in Guanajuato
Radio stations established in 1988